Mansurbek Chashemov (born June 22, 1983) is an Uzbekistani weightlifter. He represented Uzbekistan at the 2008 Summer Olympics in Beijing, where he placed seventh in the men's light heavyweight category (85 kg), with a snatch of 165 kg, and a clean and jerk of 202 kg, for a total of 367 kg.

Major results

References

External links
NBC 2008 Olympics profile

Uzbekistani male weightlifters
1983 births
Living people
Olympic weightlifters of Uzbekistan
Weightlifters at the 2008 Summer Olympics
Weightlifters at the 2010 Asian Games
Asian Games medalists in weightlifting
Asian Games silver medalists for Uzbekistan
Medalists at the 2010 Asian Games
20th-century Uzbekistani people
21st-century Uzbekistani people